The Organisation for Economic Co-operation and Development (OECD; , OCDE) is an intergovernmental organisation with 38 member countries, founded in 1961 to stimulate economic progress and world trade. It is a forum whose member countries describe themselves as committed to democracy and the market economy, providing a platform to compare policy experiences, seek answers to common problems, identify good practices, and coordinate domestic and international policies of its members. 

The majority of OECD members are high-income economies with a very high Human Development Index (HDI), and are regarded as developed countries. Their collective population is 1.38 billion. , the OECD member countries collectively comprised 62.2% of global nominal GDP (US$49.6 trillion) and 42.8% of global GDP (Int$54.2 trillion) at purchasing power parity. The OECD is an official United Nations observer.

In April 1948, the Organisation for European Economic Co-operation (OEEC), was established to help administer the Marshall Plan, which was rejected by both the Soviet Union and its satellite states. This would be achieved by allocating the United States' financial aid and implementing economic programs for the reconstruction of Europe after World War II. Only Western European states were members of the OEEC. Its Secretaries-General were the Frenchmen Robert Marjolin (1948–1955) and René Sergent (1955–1960). On 14 December 1960, the OEEC was reformed into the Organisation for Economic Co-operation and Development, coming into force in late September 1961, and the membership was extended to non-European states, the USA and Canada.

The OECD's headquarters are at the Château de la Muette in Paris, France. The OECD is funded by contributions from member countries at varying rates and had a total budget of € 386 million in 2019, and is recognised as a highly influential publisher of mostly economic data through publications as well as annual evaluations and rankings of member countries.

History

Organisation for European Economic Co-operation
The Organisation for European Economic Co-operation (OEEC) was formed in 1948 to administer American and Canadian aid in the framework of the Marshall Plan for the reconstruction of Europe after World War II. Similar reconstruction aid was sent to the war-torn Republic of China and post-war Korea, under the title of Official Development Assistance (ODA), provided by the OEEC's Development Assistance Committee (DAC), which Korea joined in 2010. 

The organisation began its operations on 16 April 1948, originating from the work done by the Committee of European Economic Co-operation in 1947 in preparation for the Marshall Plan. Since 1949, it has been headquartered in the Château de la Muette in Paris, France. Succeeding the Marshall Plan, the OEEC became focused on economic issues.

In the 1950s, the OEEC provided the framework for negotiations aimed at determining conditions for setting up a European Free Trade Area, to bring the European Economic Community of the Inner Six and the other OEEC members together on a multilateral basis. In 1958, a European Nuclear Energy Agency was set up under the OEEC.

By the end of the 1950s, with the job of rebuilding Europe effectively complete, some leading countries felt that the OEEC had outlived its purpose but could be adapted to fulfil a more global mission, which proved to be a cumbersome task. Following several (occasionally unruly) meetings at the Hotel Majestic in Paris, which began in January 1960, a resolution was reached to create a body that would not only solve European and Atlantic economic issues, but also devise policies that could assist less developed countries. This reconstituted organisation would bring the US and Canada, who were already OEEC observers, on board as full members, and the OEEC would set to work straight away on convincing Japan to join the organisation.

Founding
Following the 1957 Rome Treaties to launch the European Economic Community, the Convention on the Organisation for Economic Co-operation and Development was brought together to reform the OEEC. The Convention was signed in December 1960, and the OECD officially superseded the OEEC in September 1961, consisting of the European founder countries of the OEEC, with the additions of the United States and Canada. Three countries, (Netherlands, Luxembourg, and Italy)—all OEEC members—ratified the OECD Convention after September 1961, but are nevertheless considered founding members. The official founding members are:

Austria
Belgium
Canada
Denmark
France
Germany
Greece
Iceland
Ireland
Italy
Luxembourg
Netherlands
Norway
Portugal
Spain
Sweden
Switzerland
Turkey
United Kingdom
United States

During the next 12 years, Japan, Finland, Australia, and New Zealand also joined the organisation. Yugoslavia had observer status in the organisation starting with the establishment of the OECD until its dissolution as a country. The OECD also created agencies such as the OECD Development Centre (1961), International Energy Agency (IEA, 1974), and Financial Action Task Force on Money Laundering.

Unlike the organisations of the United Nations system, OECD uses the spelling "organisation" with an "s" in its name rather than "organization".

Enlargement to Central Europe
Following the Revolutions of 1989, the OECD began assisting countries in Central Europe (especially the Visegrád Group) to prepare market economy reforms. In 1990, the Centre for Co-operation with European Economies in Transition (now succeeded by the Centre for Cooperation with Non-Members) was established, and in 1991, the programme, "Partners in Transition," was launched for the benefit of Czechoslovakia, Hungary and Poland, including a membership option for these countries. As a result of this, Poland, Hungary, the Czech Republic and Slovakia, as well as Mexico and South Korea became members of the OECD between 1994 and 2000.

Reform and further enlargement
In the 1990s, several European countries, now members of the European Union, expressed their willingness to join the organisation. In 1995, Cyprus applied for membership, but according to the Cypriot government, it was vetoed by Turkey. In 1996, Estonia, Latvia, and Lithuania signed a Joint Declaration expressing willingness to become members of the OECD, and Slovenia also applied for membership that same year. In 2005, Malta applied to join the organisation. The EU is lobbying for the admission of all EU member states. Romania reaffirmed in 2012 its intention to become a member of the organisation through the letter addressed by Romanian Prime Minister Victor Ponta to then-OECD Secretary-General José Ángel Gurría. In September 2012, the government of Bulgaria confirmed it would apply for membership before the OECD Secretariat.

The OECD established a working group headed by ambassador Seiichiro Noboru to work out a plan for the enlargement with non-members. The working group defined four criteria that must be fulfilled: "like-mindedness," "significant player," "mutual benefit" and "global considerations." The working group's recommendations were presented at the OECD Ministerial Council Meeting on 13 May 2004, and on 16 May 2007, the OECD Ministerial Council decided to open accession discussions with Chile, Estonia, Israel, Russia, and Slovenia, and to strengthen cooperation with Brazil, China, India, Indonesia, and South Africa through a process of enhanced engagement. Chile, Slovenia, Israel, and Estonia all became members in 2010. In March 2014, the OECD halted membership talks with Russia in response to its role in the 2014 Annexation of Crimea.

In 2013, the OECD decided to open membership talks with Colombia and Latvia. In 2015, the organisation opened talks with Costa Rica and Lithuania. Latvia became a member on 1 July 2016, and Lithuania soon followed on 5 July 2018. Colombia signed the accession agreement on 30 May 2018 and became a member on 28 April 2020. On 15 May 2020, the OECD decided to extend a formal invitation for Costa Rica to join the OECD, which joined as a member on 25 May 2021.

Other countries that have expressed interest in OECD membership are Argentina, Peru, Malaysia, Brazil, and Croatia.

In January 2022, the OECD reported that it had begun talks aiming toward joining Argentina, Brazil, Bulgaria, Croatia, Peru and Romania.

In March 2022, the OECD suspended the participation of Russia and Belarus due to the ongoing 2022 Russian invasion of Ukraine.

In June 2022, during the annual OECD Ministerial Council Meeting, the Roadmaps for the Accession to the OECD Convention for Brazil, Bulgaria, Croatia, Peru and Romania were adopted.

Objectives and issues

Taxation
The OECD sets the rules governing international tax for multinationals through the OECD Transfer Pricing Guidelines for Multinational Enterprises and Tax Administrations, a Model Tax Convention and country-by-country reporting rules. 

The OECD publishes and updates a model tax convention that serves as a template for allocating taxation rights between countries. This model is accompanied by a set of commentaries that reflect OECD-level interpretation of the content of the model convention provisions. In general, this model allocates the primary right to tax to the country from which capital investment originates (i.e., the home, or resident country) rather than the country in which the investment is made (the host, or source country). As a result, it is most effective between two countries with reciprocal investment flows (such as among the OECD member countries), but can be unbalanced when one of the signatory countries is economically weaker than the other (such as between OECD and non-OECD pairings). Additionally, the OECD has published and updated the Transfer Pricing Guidelines since 1995. The Transfer Pricing Guidelines serve as a template for the profit allocation of inter-company transactions to countries. The latest version, of July 2017, incorporates the approved Actions developed under the Base Erosion and Profit Shifting (BEPS) project initiated by the G20.

Pillar 1
An OECD proposal to allocate multinational profits (for taxing purposes) to countries where they do business, by a formula, including to markets which multinationals sell into without a physical presence. This is hoped to eliminate the need for Digital Services Tax implemented by several countries, including France. There are exclusions and minimum thresholds, including banking and extractive industries. The proposal involves allocating only residual profit (i.e., profits above what is established through transfer pricing, thus creating a hybrid mechanism). This is essentially no change to what is currently allowed (routine profits allocated using transfer pricing + residual profits allocated through profit split).
Pillar 2
On 1 July 2021, finance officials from 130 countries agreed on plans for a new international taxation policy known as the global minimum corporate tax (of 15%). If a country taxes a multinational at a lower rate, the multinational's HQ will receive the difference.

It is not certain when the proposals will be implemented. 

All the major economies agreed to pass national laws that would require corporations to pay at least 15% income tax in the countries they operate. This new policy would end the practice of locating world headquarters in small countries with very low taxation rates. Governments hope to recoup some of the lost revenue, estimated at $100 billion to $240 billion each year. The new system was promoted by the Biden Administration in the United States and the OECD. Secretary-General Mathias Cormann of the OECD said, "This historic package will ensure that large multinational companies pay their fair share of tax everywhere."

Multinational corporations
The OECD Guidelines for Multinational Enterprises are a set of legally non-binding guidelines attached as an annex to the OECD Declaration on International Investment and Multinational Enterprises. They are recommendations providing principles and standards for responsible business conduct for multinational corporations operating in or from countries adhering to the Declaration.

Bid rigging
The OECD's work on bid rigging includes the publication of guidelines for fighting this practice in the context of public procurement. In a Policy Brief issued in October 2008, OECD noted that "programmes to systematically educate procurement officials exist in only a few OECD countries". "Guidelines for Fighting Bid Rigging in Public Procurement" were published in 2009 and incorporated into a "Recommendation on Fighting Bid Rigging in Public Procurement" which was adopted on 17 July 2012, calling on member governments "to assess their public procurement laws and practices at all levels of government to promote more effective procurement and reduce the risk of bid rigging in public tenders".

Publications
The OECD publishes books, reports, statistics, working papers, and reference materials. All titles and databases published since 1998 can be accessed via OECD iLibrary. The OECD Library & Archives collection dates from 1947, including records from the Committee for European Economic Co-operation (CEEC) and the Organisation for European Economic Co-operation (OEEC), predecessors of today's OECD. External researchers can consult OECD publications and archival material on the OECD premises by appointment.

Books

The OECD releases between 300 and 500 books each year. The publications are updated to the OECD iLibrary. Most books are published in English and French. The OECD flagship titles include:
 The OECD Economic Outlook, published twice a year. It contains forecast and analysis of the economic situation of the OECD member countries. The OECD exceptionally published the 2020 Economic Outlook on 10 June 2020 to adjust economic forecasts greatly impacted by the Coronavirus since the March Interim Economic Outlook. The June Economic Outlook assesses the economic impact of COVID-19 and provides projections for economic impact if a second outbreak were to occur. 
 The Main Economic Indicators, published monthly. It contains a large selection of timely statistical indicators.
 The OECD Factbook is published yearly and available online, as an iPhone app, and in print. The Factbook contains more than 100 economic, environmental and social indicators, each presented with a clear definition, tables, and graphs. The Factbook mainly focuses on the statistics of its member countries and sometimes other major additional countries. It is freely accessible online and delivers all the data in Excel format via StatLinks.
 The OECD Communications Outlook and the OECD Internet Economy Outlook (formerly the Information Technology Outlook), which rotate every year. They contain forecasts and analysis of the communications and information technology industries in OECD member countries and non-member economies.
 In 2007 the OECD published Human Capital: How what you know shapes your life, the first book in the OECD Insights series. This series uses OECD analysis and data to introduce important social and economic issues to non-specialist readers. Other books in the series cover sustainable development, international trade and international migration.

All OECD books are available on the OECD iLibrary, the online bookshop or OECD Library & Archives.

Magazine
OECD Observer, an award-winning magazine, was launched in 1962. The magazine appeared six times a year until 2010, and became quarterly in 2011 with the introduction of the OECD Yearbook, launched for the 50th anniversary of the organisation. The online and mobile editions are updated regularly and contain news, analysis, reviews, commentaries and data on global economic, social and environmental challenges and listings of the latest OECD books. An OECD Observer Crossword was introduced in Q2 2013.

Statistics
The OECD is known as a statistical agency, as it publishes comparable statistics on numerous subjects. In July 2014, the OECD publicly released its main statistical databases through the OECD Data Portal, an online platform that allows visitors to create custom charts based on official OECD indicators.

OECD statistics are available in several forms:
 as interactive charts on the OECD Data Portal,
as interactive databases on iLibrary together with key comparative and country tables,
 as static files or dynamic database views on the OECD Statistics portal,
 as StatLinks (in most OECD books, there is a URL that links to the underlying data).

Working papers
There are 15 working papers series published by the various directorates of the OECD Secretariat. They are available on iLibrary, as well as on many specialised portals.

Reference works

The OECD is responsible for the OECD Guidelines for the Testing of Chemicals, a continuously updated document that is a de facto standard (i.e., soft law).

It has published the OECD Environmental Outlook to 2030, which shows that tackling the key environmental problems we face today—including climate change, biodiversity loss, water scarcity, and the health impacts of pollution—is both achievable and affordable.

Structure
The OECD's structure consists of three main elements:
 The OECD member countries, each represented by a delegation led by an ambassador. Together, they form the OECD Council. Member countries act collectively through Council (and its Standing Committees) to provide direction and guidance to the work of Organisation.
 The OECD Substantive Committees, one for each work area of the OECD, plus their various subsidiary bodies. Committee members are typically subject-matter experts from member and non-member governments. The Committees oversee all the work on each theme (publications, task forces, conferences, and so on). Committee members then relay the conclusions to their capitals.
 The OECD Secretariat, led by the Secretary-General (currently Mathias Cormann), provides support to Standing and Substantive Committees. It is organised into Directorates, which include about 2,500 staff.

Meetings

Delegates from the member countries attend committee and other meetings. Former Deputy Secretary-General  estimated in 1997 that the cost borne by the member countries, such as sending their officials to OECD meetings and maintaining permanent delegations, is equivalent to the cost of running the secretariat. This ratio is unique among inter-governmental organisations. In other words, the OECD is more a persistent forum or network of officials and experts than an administration.

The OECD regularly holds minister-level meetings and forums as platforms for a discussion on a broad spectrum of thematic issues relevant to the OECD charter, member countries, and non-member countries.

Noteworthy meetings include:
 The yearly Ministerial Council Meeting, with the Ministers of Economy of all member countries and the candidates for enhanced engagement among the countries.
 The annual OECD Forum, which brings together leaders from business, government, labour, civil society and international organisations. Held every year since June 2000, the OECD Forum takes the form of conferences and discussions, is open to public participation and is held in conjunction with the MCM.
 Thematic Ministerial Meetings, held among Ministers of a given domain (i.e., all Ministers of Labour, all Ministers of Environment, etc.).
 The bi-annual World Forum on Statistics, Knowledge and Policies, which does not usually take place in the OECD. This series of meetings has the ambition to measure and foster progress in societies.
 The Forum for Harmful Tax Practices
 The Committee on Fiscal Affairs
 OECD Eurasia Week, which includes several high-level policy dialogue discussions to share best practices and experiences in addressing common development and economic challenges in Eurasia.

Secretariat

Exchanges between OECD governments benefit from the information, analysis, and preparation of the OECD Secretariat. The secretariat collects data, monitors trends, and analyses and forecasts economic developments. Under the direction and guidance of member governments, it also researches social changes or evolving patterns in trade, environment, education, agriculture, technology, taxation and other areas.

The secretariat is organised in Directorates:
 Centre for Entrepreneurship, SMEs, Regions and Cities
 Centre for Tax Policy and Administration
 Development Co-operation Directorate
 Directorate for Education and Skills
 Directorate for Employment, Labour, and Social Affairs
 Directorate for Financial and Enterprise Affairs
 Directorate for Science, Technology, and Innovation
 Economics Department
 Environment Directorate
 Public Governance Directorate
 Statistics Directorate
 Trade and Agriculture Directorate
 General Secretariat
 Executive Directorate
 Public Affairs and Communication Directorate

Secretary-General
The head of the OECD Secretariat and chair of the OECD Council is the Secretary-General. Secretary-General selections are made by consensus, meaning all member states must agree on a candidate.

Committees

Representatives of member and observer countries meet in specialised committees on specific policy areas, such as economics, trade, science, employment, education, development assistance or financial markets. There are about 200 committees, working groups and expert groups. Committees discuss policies and review progress in the given policy area.

Special bodies
OECD has a number of specialised bodies:
 Africa Partnership Forum
 Business and Industry Advisory Committee (BIAC)
 Development Assistance Committee
 OECD Development Centre
 International Transport Forum (ITF) (formally known as the European Conference of Ministers of Transport)
 International Energy Agency
 Nuclear Energy Agency
 Multilateral Organisation Performance Assessment Network (MOPAN)
 Partnership for Democratic Governance (PDG)
 Sahel and West Africa Club
 Trade Union Advisory Committee (TUAC)

Decision-making process
OECD decisions are made through voting, which requires unanimity among all of those voting. However, dissenting members which do not wish to block a decision but merely to signal their disapproval can abstain from voting.

Member countries

Current members
As of May 2021 there are 38 members of the OECD:

The European Commission participates in the work of the OECD alongside the EU member states. Dependent territories of member states are not members in their own right, but may have membership as part of their controlling state. As of January 2021, the Dutch Caribbean and the British territories of Guernsey, Jersey, the Isle of Man, Gibraltar, and Bermuda are included as part of the OECD memberships of the Netherlands and the U.K., respectively. Other dependent territories of OECD member states are not members of the OECD.

Former members
The Free Territory of Trieste (Zone A) was a member of the OEEC until 1954, when it ceased to exist as an independent territorial entity.

Countries whose accession talks were terminated
In May 2007, the OECD decided to open accession negotiations with Russia. In March 2014, the OECD halted membership talks in response to Russia's role in that year's Crimean Annexation and continuous human and civil rights abuses. On 25 February 2022, the OECD terminated the accession process with Russia after it invaded Ukraine.

Countries whose membership is under negotiation

Applicants 

  applied in 2007 
  applied in 2022

Budget 
As of 2019, the OECD’s budget is composed of Part I and Part II programmes of work. All member countries contribute funding to the Part I budget, representing around two-thirds of OECD Part I expenditure. The contributions (see table below) are based on both a proportion that is shared equally among member countries and a scale that is proportional to the relative size of their economies. The Part I budget for 2019 is EUR 202.5 million. The part II budgets, meanwhile, cover programmes that are of interest to a limited number of members and are funded according to scales of contributions or other agreements among the participating countries. The consolidated Part II budgets for 2019 amount to EUR 105 million.

The overall consolidated OECD budget for 2019 comes to EUR 386 million.

See also

 Frascati Manual
 German Marshall Fund
 Good laboratory practice
 International organisations in Europe
 List of country groupings
 List of multilateral free-trade agreements
 Marshall Plan
 OECD Anti-Bribery Convention
 OECD Better Life Index
 OECD Environmental Performance Reviews
 OECD iLibrary (replaced SourceOECD in July 2010)
 OECD Working Party on SMEs and Entrepreneurship
 Official development assistance
 Transfer pricing
 International Transport Forum

Notes

References

External links

 Organisation for Economic Co-operation and Development

 
International economic organizations
International trade organizations
Organizations based in Paris
Organizations established in 1948
United Nations General Assembly observers
16th arrondissement of Paris
Forecasting organizations
International organizations based in France